Cedar Creek is a  tributary stream of the North Fork Shenandoah River in northern Virginia in the United States. It forms the majority of the boundary between Frederick and Shenandoah counties. Cedar Creek's confluence with the North Fork Shenandoah is located at Strasburg.

It was the site of the 1864 Battle of Cedar Creek in the American Civil War.

Tributaries
Tributary streams are listed from Cedar Creek's headwaters to its mouth.

Shell Run
Cold Spring Run
Paddy Run
Gravel Springs Run
Duck Run
Fall Run
Lick Run
Turkey Run
Eishelman Run
Indian Run
Swamp Run
Mulberry Run
Zanes Run
Middle Marsh Brook
Watson Run
Meadow Brook
Stickley Run

List of cities and towns along Cedar Creek
Gravel Springs
Lebanon Church
Marlboro
Meadow Mills
Oranda
Star Tannery
Strasburg
Zepp

See also
List of rivers of Virginia

References

Rivers of Virginia
Rivers of Frederick County, Virginia
Rivers of Shenandoah County, Virginia
Rivers of Warren County, Virginia
Tributaries of the Shenandoah River